The Youth in Music Band Championships is an annual high school marching band competition in Minneapolis, Minnesota. It is one of the largest marching band events in the Upper Midwest, attracting two dozen competitors and thousands of spectators every year. The 16th Annual championships will be hosted on October 10, 2020, at U.S. Bank Stadium.

The first championship was held in 2005. Since 2006, state championship honors have been awarded to competing bands from Minnesota.

The competition has been called the YIM Grand Championships and YIM Upper Midwest Championships. The competition and its awards are also known as the YIMMYs.

History

Past participants 
Bands from Minnesota, Illinois, Wisconsin, Iowa, South Dakota and Nebraska have attended YIM since its inception. The following is an incomplete list of recent and past participating bands.

 Indicates a past participant.

Illinois bands 
 South High School, Downers Grove
 Lincoln-Way Community High School District 210
Lincoln-Way Central High School, New Lenox
 Lincoln-Way East High School, Frankfort

Iowa bands 
 MOC-Floyd Valley High School, Orange City
 Sioux City Community Schools
North High School, Sioux City
 West High School, Sioux City

Minnesota bands

South Dakota bands

Nebraska bands 
 Bellevue East High School, Bellevue
 Millard North High School, Omaha
 Millard West High School, Omaha

Wisconsin bands

Past championship locations

Classification and adjudication 
YIM utilizes the Mid-America Competing Band Directors Association Adjudication Handbook. However, the competition is not affiliated with MACBDA. Tabulation software is provided by Competition Suite.

Classifications 
Three classes, A, AA, AAA, have been available since 2005. In 2016, AAAA Class was added. Criteria for class alignment is unknown. However, an archived FAQ from 2007 suggested participating bands consider school attendance and the number of performing members when selecting a class.

Captions and rubric 
Scoring is based on two broad categories: Performance, and Effect. The categories are further divided into four reference criteria or captions, with each given a maximum value of 200 points, or up to 20 points when factored. Percussion and Auxiliary (or color guard) captions are also available. Both given a maximum value of 100 points, or ten points when factored. The final score is tabulated by adding all captions, less any penalties.

One adjudicator is assigned to each caption, and one each for percussion and auxiliary. An additional adjudicator is responsible for timing and penalties.

YIM does not have captions for drum majors, twirling teams and majorettes, or dance teams. Performance excellence by a drum major is recognized by the Effect or Performance adjudicators where appropriate. Twirlers and dance teams fall under the responsibility of the Auxiliary adjudicator. Almost all participating bands will perform with a color guard team.

Awards and honors 
As of 2017, the top scoring band in each class, and the next six highest scoring bands from the first, preliminary, round advance to the final round. The two rounds are called Sessions I and II by competition organizers. Following the preliminary round, caption awards for "Outstanding Percussion", "Outstanding Winds", and "Outstanding Color Guard" which are given to recipients in each class.

YIMMY awards 
Recognition is also given to "Best Drum Major" and "Best Performer" in response to their performance excellence. The "Spirit of YIMMY" award is given to one band each year in recognition for their esprit de corps. The criteria for these awards is unknown.

An award memorializing musician Butch DuFault is given to an outstanding band director. YIM has awarded academic scholarships to participating students in the past.

Minnesota State Marching Band Championships 
YIM began awarding state championship honors in 2006. The format for such awards has varied. In 2017, honors were given to the top three highest scoring Minnesota bands in each class. A single state champion award has also been announced in years prior.

The inclusion of a state championship award was likely due to other Minnesota music education organizations lack of sanctioned marching band events. Minnesota State High School League (MSHSL), the Minnesota NFHS affiliate, only organizes soloist and small ensemble festivals. Minnesota Music Educators Association (MMEA), the Minnesota NAfME affiliate, organizes an All-State honor band program which includes concert and jazz bands. And the Minnesota Band Directors Association (MBDA) has only issued guidelines for marching band performances, in addition to organizing an alternative All-State concert and jazz honor band.

Past champions 
YIM realigned the classes available in 2016. A Grand Champion award was not awarded in 2005.

Minnesota State Marching Band Champions 
Below is an incomplete list of Minnesota State Marching Band Champions awarded at YIM:

See also 
 Bands of America
 Mid-America Competing Band Directors Association
 Northwest Association for Performing Arts
 Western Band Association

References 

Music organizations based in the United States
High school marching bands from the United States
Educational organizations based in the United States